The 2006 Vuelta a España was held from 26 August to 17 September 2006, and was the 61st edition of the race.

Teams and riders

In addition to the 20 UCI ProTour teams, Relax–GAM have received a wild card.

List of stages

 Mountain stages with asterisk end on the top of the climb.

Stage recaps
Vuelta a España 2006, Stage 1 to Stage 11
Vuelta a España 2006, Stage 12 to Stage 21

Jersey progress

Jersey wearers when same rider is holding multiple jerseys:
 Lars Bak wore the points jersey in stage 2
 Paolo Bettini wore the points jersey in stages 4–5
 Janez Brajkovič wore the white combination jersey in stages 6–7
 José Miguel Elías wore the orange mountains jersey in stages 6–7
 Danilo Di Luca wore the orange mountains jersey in stages 8–9
 Alejandro Valverde wore the white combination jersey in stages 8–9
 Carlos Sastre wore the white combination jersey in stages 8–16
 Alexander Vinokourov wore the white combination jersey in stage 17
 Andrey Kashechkin wore the white combination jersey in stage 19-21
 When he has been 2nd in combination classification behind GC leader, Alejandro Valverde has worn white jersey of UCI ProTour leader. This happened on stages 8, 9, 19, 20 and 21.

Final standings

General classification (final)

{| class="wikitable"
!Rank!!Rider!!Team!!Time
|- 
|1|| Alexander Vinokourov||||align="right"| '81h 23' 07"
|-
|2|| Alejandro Valverde||||align="right"| 1' 12"
|- 
|3|| Andrey Kashechkin||||align=right| 3' 12"
|-
|4|| Carlos Sastre||||align="right"| 3' 35"
|- 
|5|| José Ángel Gómez Marchante||||align=right| 6' 51"
|- 
|6|| Tom Danielson||||align=right| 8' 09"
|-
|7|| Samuel Sánchez||||align=right| 8' 26"
|-
|8|| Manuel Beltrán||||align=right| 10' 36"
|-
|9|| Vladimir Karpets||||align="right"| 10' 47"
|-
|10|| Luis Pérez Rodríguez||||align="right"| 11' 32"
|}

Points classification

In 2006, the leader of the points classification is awarded a blue with yellow-fish-covered jersey, which is sponsored by Spain's fishing and marine industry known as FROM (or El Fondo de Regulación y Organización del Mercado de Productos de la Pesca y Cultivos Marinos). 

Mountains classification

In 2006, the leader of the climbers classification (or King of the Mountains) wears the orange jersey sponsored by Ford. In recent years, the KoM wore a red jersey.

Combination classification

In 2006, the leader of the combinations classification wears the white jersey''. In 2005, the rider with the lowest cumulative rank of all classifications wore a gold-green jersey.

Teams classification

External links
La Vuelta (Official site in Spanish, English, and French)
cyclingnews.com

 
Vuelta a España by year
Espana
1